Espectacular (English: Spectacular) is the thenth studio album by Mexican singer-songwriter Juan Gabriel, originally released in 1978 and re-released on July 30, 1996. This was the first Juan Gabriel album with the Ariola label. It was recorded in Europe with The London Symphony Orchestra and The Ray Conniff Orchestra.

Track listing

References

External links 
Juan Gabriel official website
 Espectacular on amazon.com
[] Espectacular on allmusic.com

1978 albums
Juan Gabriel albums
RCA Records albums
Spanish-language albums